The 1919 Swarthmore Quakers football team was an American football team that represented Swarthmore College as an independent during the 1919 college football season. The team compiled a 7–1 record and outscored opponents by a total of 145 to 79. Leroy Mercer was the head coach.

Schedule

References

Swarthmore
Swarthmore Garnet Tide football seasons
Swarthmore Quakers football